GB Pant DSEU Okhla-1 Campus (also GBPEC or Govind Ballabh Pant Engineering College) is a government engineering college located in Okhla, Delhi, India. It was established in 2007 by the Directorate of Training and Technical Education of the Delhi Government. The college is affiliated to Delhi Skill and Entrepreneurship University (DSEU). It is also AICTE approved.The college was affiliated to Guru Gobind Singh Indraprastha University till 2020 but Now the college is affiliated to DSEU(from 2021).

About 

Right education & academic environment leads students to develop responsible & sustainable solutions to real world problems. GB Pant DSEU Okhla 1 campus (Formerly known as G B Pant Engineering College) providing such a learning environment was rechristened and found its home under the ages of Delhi Skill & Entrepreneurship University (DSEU) in the year 2020.  It was originally founded in the year 2007 by the Govt. of NCT of Delhi to run B.Tech programs & boasts of its excellent UPSC qualified faculty, distinguished alumni & some of the brightest minds competing year on year through the JAC counselling. The institute was established with the aim of imparting quality technical education for the students of Delhi & nearby areas. Today to name a few, we have our proud alumni in Apple India, Oracle USA, Nike USA, ISRO, Indian Navy etc. Our students are regularly placed in top organizations like TCS, Infosys, Maruti, Amazon, Byju’s, Godrej, Accenture, Ericsson, Hitachi etc. with above industry packages.

Admission Process 
For admission in B.Tech Programs the university accepts JEE Mains Score and you can get admission here through JAC Counselling. Joint Admission Counselling (JAC) for admission to Undergraduate Programmes in premier Delhi Government funded universities, offering Engineering, Architecture and Management programmes started in the year 2014, as an initiative of the Govt. of NCT of Delhi, to avoid multiple admission counselings and save the candidates and their guardian from the resulting inconvenience because of shifting of students from one institution to the other during the admission process. This year, Delhi Technological University (DTU), Indira Gandhi Delhi Technical University for Women (IGDTUW), Indraprastha Institute of Information Technology, Delhi (IIITD), Netaji Subhas University of Technology (NSUT) and Delhi Skill and Entrepreneurship University(DSEU) are participating in JAC which is being conducted online with the support of the National Informatics Centre (NIC).

Programs Offered 

 B.Tech. in Mechanical Engineering
 B.Tech. in Electronics & Communication Engineering
 B.Tech. in Computer Science Engineering
 M.Tech. in Mechanical Engineering
 M.Tech. in Computer Science Engineering
 M.Tech. in Electronics & Communication Engineering

Campus And Land Controversy

GBPEC campus is located in  Okhla Phase-III, New Delhi. In 2017, the land dispute with IIIT Delhi with GBPEC led to protests by students and alumni of GBPEC. to get the attention of Delhi government on the issue. As of March 2019, the Delhi cabinet allowed the training and technical education department to construct an integrated campus for G.B. Pant Engineering College and Polytechnic in Okhla Industrial Estate at an estimated cost of 526.7 crore.The campus area is good and facilities are improving day by day. 

At the time of establishment, in 2007, 60 acres of land was granted to the college by Delhi government. One year later, the college was instructed to share the land with IIIT Delhi; an autonomous state institute which was previously operating in the campus of NSIT, Delhi. In nine years, IIIT Delhi spread itself over an area of 25 acres with all the resources, including acoustic lecture halls, basketball courts, tennis courts, football field and hostels. Meanwhile, G. B. Pant Engineering College kept functioning from the abandoned dormitory building of G.B Pant Polytechnic, covering barely 2.48 acres. 

In 2017, the land dispute grew further when IIIT Delhi refused share its campus with their old neighboring college. Students and alumni of GBPEC launched a peaceful protest to get the attention of Delhi government on the issue. As of March 2017, no decisive action is taken by Delhi government.

G.B. Pant Polytechnic was established in 1961. It was named after Pandit Govind Ballabh Pant, a renowned freedom fighter and an able administrator. This Polytechnic flaunts its name in the international arena by being the biggest Polytechnic in Asia. The total land area available as present is 188647.13 sq.m. (46.61 Acres). A piece of land measuring 95694.97 sq. m. (23.64 Acres) out of 188647.13 sq.m. (46.61 Acres) allotted to IITD campus. Therefore, total site area available for Integrated campus of G.B. Pant Engineering College and Polytechnic is 92952.16 sq. m. (22.96 Acres) .It consists of Administrative building, Academic buildings, Activity Centre, workshop, Type-IV Residential  Quarters, Hostel  and playgrounds. G B Pant Engineering College was established by the Govt. of NCT of Delhi in the year 2007. The college has been operating from its building in G B Pant Polytechnic campus. The college is Affiliated to Guru Gobind Singh University and approved by AICTE.  Govt. of NCT of Delhi also established Indraprashta institute of Information Technology (IIITD) in the year 2008.

New Campus Progress 

The New campus project was approved by the cabinet in year 2019  with a budget of 526 Crores .

GB PANT ENGINEERING COLLEGE one of the renowned engineering college designed(MEP services) by ECMS India Private Limited. 

After a two-year long break, work on the 𝗚𝗕 𝗣𝗔𝗡𝗧 𝗜𝗡𝗧𝗘𝗚𝗥𝗔𝗧𝗘𝗗 𝗧𝗘𝗖𝗛𝗡𝗜𝗖𝗔𝗟 𝗖𝗔𝗠𝗣𝗨𝗦 more than 10 lakh square feet, a prestigious project for ECMS India Private Limited will be resumed.(Linkedin Post by ECMS India Pvt. Ltd). The New campus is being built by DDF Consultants.

 Phase-I Construction shall takes place for Engineering college and Polytechnic.
 Residential Facilities shall be minimal and no student accommodation shall be provided in the campus.
 Common facilities shall be integrated for Polytechnic and Engineering College like workshop, library, central labs etc. A centralized block of integrated facilities shall be designed for both the institutes.
 The South side plot on which presently the Mechanical workshop block of Polytechnic is located shall be surrendered to IIITD and the triangular site area in the west direction shall be provided for the Polytechnic and Engineering College.
 Teaching areas shall be air conditioned.
 The central atrium in between both the institute shall be covered with appropriate material and it can be used as an activity area for both the colleges.
 Basement parking shall be proposed for achieving the permissible ECS.
 Multiple Entry and exists shall be proposed for the campus.

Construction of GB Pant Integrated Technical campus was not started due to non receipt of approval from local bodies. NOC from Delhi Jal Board and Delhi Fire Service has been received on dated 27.01.2023 and 01.02.2023. Approval of layout plan from MCD is under process and still pending with MCD. Construction of GB Pant Integrated Technical campus is likely to be start from June 2023 after approval of layout plan from MCD.(update 13.02.2023)

Placements 
The institute was established with the aim of imparting quality technical education for the students of Delhi & nearby areas. Today to name a few, we have our proud alumni in Apple India, Oracle USA, Nike USA, ISRO, Indian Navy etc. Our students are regularly placed in top organizations like TCS, Infosys, Maruti, Amazon, Byju’s, Godrej, Accenture, Ericsson, Hitachi etc. with above industry packages.

College Societies/Fests 

 Buniyaad- The Theatre Society of GB Pant Government Engineering College DSEU Okhla Campus 1 Motto- अगर वक़्त को रोकना आसान होता तो बुनियाद हमारी पहचान होती 
 Riwaayat- The Annual Street Play Fest
 COPs- Club of Programmers
 I&D- Innovation and Development Club
 IEEE - Institute of Electrical and Electronics Engineers- GB Pant DSEU Okhla Campus-1 
 Google Students Development Club(GDSC)- GB Pant DSEU Okhla Campus-1
 Team Zenith - Automotive Society of GB Pant DSEU Okhla Campus-1
 Samidha GBPEC(DSEU): A learning hub where we teach and help underprivileged children of our society

References

External links 
 GBPEC Official Website

Universities and colleges in Delhi
Engineering colleges in Delhi
Educational institutions established in 2007
2007 establishments in Delhi